Winder Laird Henry (December 20, 1864 – July 5, 1940) was an American politician.

Early life
Henry was born near Cambridge, Maryland, and attended the public schools as a youth. He engaged in mercantile pursuits and purchased an interest in and became editor of the Cambridge Chronicle.

Career
He was elected as a Democrat to the Fifty-third Congress to fill the vacancy caused by the death of Robert Franklin Brattan and served from November 6, 1894, to March 3, 1895, but was not a candidate for renomination in 1894.

After Congress, Henry resumed newspaper work until 1898, at which point he commenced the study of law. He was admitted to the bar of Dorchester County, Maryland in 1898 and engaged in practice in Cambridge.  He served as colonel on the staff of Gov. John Walter Smith from 1899 to 1903 and was commissioner of the land office of Maryland April 1, 1908 to May 1, 1908. He was appointed chief judge of the first judicial circuit in May 1908 and served until October 1, 1909, when he resumed the practice of law in Cambridge. He also engaged in banking and was a member of the Maryland Public Service Commission from August 1, 1914 to June 1, 1916.

Personal life
Henry was the great-grandson of Charles Goldsborough and Robert Henry Goldsborough, and the son of Daniel Maynadier Henry.

Death
Henry died in Cambridge, and is interred in Christ Church Cemetery.

References

1864 births
1940 deaths
American newspaper editors
Judges of the Maryland Court of Appeals
People from Dorchester County, Maryland
Democratic Party members of the United States House of Representatives from Maryland
Goldsborough family